

Teams 
A total of 16 teams will contest the league. At the end of the season, the last four teams will be relegated.

League table

References

3